Marius Ngjela (born 22 January 1983) is an Albanian former professional footballer who played as a forward for a number of Albanian football clubs including Skënderbeu and Partizani.

Honours

Clubs
Besa
Albanian Supercup (1): 2010

References

External links
 

1983 births
Living people
Footballers from Korçë
Albanian footballers
Association football forwards
KF Skënderbeu Korçë players
KS Pogradeci players
Besëlidhja Lezhë players
FK Partizani Tirana players
Flamurtari Vlorë players
KS Gramozi Ersekë players
Besa Kavajë players
FC Kamza players
KF Butrinti players
Bilisht Sport players
Kategoria Superiore players
Kategoria e Parë players
Kategoria e Dytë players